Matthew O'Donnell (born March 26, 1989) is a former professional Canadian football offensive lineman who played for ten years with the Edmonton Eskimos (Edmonton Elks) franchise of the Canadian Football League (CFL). He is a Vanier Cup champion after winning with the Queen's Gaels in 2009 and he is a Grey Cup champion after winning with Edmonton in 2015.

Early life
O'Donnell played high school football at Holy Cross Catholic Secondary School in Kingston, Ontario.

University career
O'Donnell played CIS football for the Queen's Gaels from 2007 to 2010. He was named a CIS All-Canadian in 2009 and 2010 at offensive tackle. On December 17, 2010, it was announced that O'Donnell was one of two CIS players to be named to the East–West Shrine Game.

Professional career

CFL
In the Canadian Football League's Amateur Scouting Bureau final rankings, he was ranked as the 11th best player for players eligible in the 2011 CFL Draft, and sixth by players in the CIS. O'Donnell was chosen in the second round and 15th overall by the Saskatchewan Roughriders. He was the fourth offensive lineman taken in the draft, but was the highest CIS offensive lineman selected.

NBA
On May 31, 2011, it was reported that O'Donnell had chosen to delay his signing with the Roughriders due to the NBA's Boston Celtics put him through a workout session in June. This move was seen as peculiar given the fact that he had not played basketball since high school.

O'Donnell also received interest from the Toronto Raptors and he attended a workout in June 2011.

Cincinnati Bengals
On July 26, 2011, O'Donnell signed a contract with the Cincinnati Bengals one day after the 2011 NFL Lockout. In December 2011, O'Donnell signed a 2-year extension with the Bengals. He was waived by the Bengals on August 31, 2012.

Edmonton Eskimos
The Roughriders traded O'Donnell's rights to the Edmonton Eskimos on September 5, 2012. He was officially signed by the Eskimos on September 17, 2012. He played for the Eskimos from 2012 to 2014.

Cincinnati Bengals (II)
O'Donnell was signed by the Cincinnati Bengals again on February 2, 2015. He was waived by the Bengals on September 5, 2015, after failing to make the 53-man final roster.

Edmonton Eskimos / Elks
On September 9, 2015, O'Donnell re-signed with the Edmonton Eskimos. He played and started in eight regular season games and two post-season games, including his start at right guard in the Eskimos' 103rd Grey Cup win. O'Donnell re-signed with the Elks on June 24, 2021. He played in all 14 regular season games for the Elks in 2021. He announced his retirement on February 3, 2022.

References

External links
Edmonton Elks bio

1989 births
Living people
American football offensive linemen
Canadian football offensive linemen
Canadian players of American football
Cincinnati Bengals players
Edmonton Elks players
People from Comox, British Columbia
Players of Canadian football from British Columbia
Queen's Golden Gaels football players
Saskatchewan Roughriders players